S number may refer to:
Meter Point Administration Number, often referred to as Supply Number or S-Number, a 21-digit number used in Great Britain to uniquely identify electricity supply points;
S number (wool), an international scale measuring the fineness of the threads in woven wool.
Singular value, in mathematics, the square root of an eigenvalue of a nonnegative self-adjoint operator.